Minato Ward may refer to

Minato, Tokyo
Minato, Nagoya
Minato, Osaka

de:Minato
ko:미나토구
ja:港区